Peter Alleyne (born 31 May 1965) is a Barbadian cricketer. He played in three first-class and two List A matches for the Barbados cricket team in 1987/88.

See also
 List of Barbadian representative cricketers

References

External links
 

1965 births
Living people
Barbadian cricketers
Barbados cricketers
Cricketers from Bridgetown